The 2018 Guangzhou International Women's Open is a women's tennis tournament played on outdoor hard courts. It was the 15th edition of the Guangzhou International Women's Open, and part of the WTA International tournaments of the 2018 WTA Tour. It took place in Guangzhou, China, from September 17 through September 22, 2018.

Points and prize money

Prize money

1 Qualifiers prize money is also the Round of 32 prize money
* per team

Singles main-draw entrants

Seeds

 1 Rankings are as of September 10, 2018

Other entrants
The following players received wildcards into the singles main draw:
  Svetlana Kuznetsova
  Wang Xinyu
  Wang Xiyu
  Vera Zvonareva

The following players received entry using a protected ranking:
  Vania King
  Sabine Lisicki

The following players received entry from the qualifying draw:
  Lizette Cabrera
  Guo Hanyu
  Ivana Jorović
  Deniz Khazaniuk
  Lu Jiajing
  Karman Thandi

The following players received entry as a lucky loser:
  Zhu Lin

Withdrawals
Before the tournament
  Peng Shuai → replaced by  Vania King
  Rebecca Peterson → replaced by  Magdalena Fręch
  Aryna Sabalenka → replaced by  Fiona Ferro
  Yanina Wickmayer → replaced by  Viktorija Golubic
  Zhang Shuai → replaced by  Zhu Lin
During the tournament
  Jennifer Brady

Doubles main-draw entrants

Seeds

 1 Rankings are as of September 10, 2018

Other entrants
The following pair received a wildcard into the doubles main draw:
  Ng Kwan-yau /  Zheng Saisai

Champions

Singles

  Wang Qiang def.  Yulia Putintseva, 6–1, 6–2

Doubles

  Monique Adamczak /  Jessica Moore def.  Danka Kovinić /  Vera Lapko,   4–6, 7–5, [10–4]

References

External links
 Official website

Guangzhou International Women's Open
Guangzhou International Women's Open
Guangzhou International Women's Open
Guangzhou International Women's Open